Dubai National School, Al Twar  is an American School located in Al Twar, Dubai, UAE. It is a private profit-making school. It has presently 1800 students enrolled.

KHDA Inspection Report

The Knowledge and Human Development Authority (KHDA) is an educational quality assurance authority based in Dubai, United Arab Emirates. It undertakes early learning, school and higher learning institution management and rates them as well.

A summary of the inspection ratings for Dubai National School, Al Twar.

A summary of all the schools in Dubai's ratings can be found at KHDA School Ratings.

References

External links
School Website https://web.archive.org/web/20110515143225/http://www.dns.sch.ae/twar.html

Student And Parent Website https://www.Dnschools.com

Schools in Dubai